Labidiaster is a genus of echinoderms belonging to the family Heliasteridae.

The species of this genus are found in the coasts of Antarctica and southernmost South America.

Species
Two species are recognized:
Labidiaster annulatus 
Labidiaster radiosus

References

Heliasteridae
Asteroidea genera